Lake Chullpacocha (possibly from Quechua chullpa an ancient burial tower, qucha lake, "chullpa lake") is a lake in the Andes of Peru. It is located in the Puno Region, Putina Province, Ananea District, south of Ananea.

References

Lakes of Puno Region
Lakes of Peru